With Love is the third studio album by British electronic producer Zomby. It was released on 17 June 2013 through 4AD.

Track listing

Charts

References

External links
 

2013 albums
4AD albums
Zomby albums